The Insular Plate was an ancient oceanic plate that began subducting under the west-coast of North America around the early Cretaceous period. The Insular Plate had a chain of active volcanic islands that were called the Insular Islands. These volcanic islands, however, collided then fused onto the west-coast of North America when the Insular Plate jammed then shut down ending the subduction zone.

See also
Insular Mountains

References

Natural history of North America
Tectonic plates
Historical tectonic plates
Cretaceous geology
Cenozoic geology